Aviatsa S.A. de C.V. (legally La Aerolínea Aviación Tecnológica) is a Honduran charter airline that was established on October 9, 2015, after obtaining an air operator's certificate by the Honduran Aviation Authorities earlier the same year.

Destinations

As February 2022, Aviatsa operates the following schedule destinations:

Fleet
As September 2022, Aviatsa has the following aircraft:

Legal problems
The airline has been investigated for allegedly receiving a US$113,000 dollars bribe to open a route to Islas de la Bahia in Honduras, as part of a larger investigation known in Honduras as the "Pandora Case" or "Caso Pandora".

See also
List of airlines of Honduras

External links

2015 establishments in Honduras
Airlines established in 2015
Companies of Honduras